Rodrick Kuku (born 6 April 1990) is a DR Congo judoka.

He competed at the 2016 Summer Olympics in Rio de Janeiro, in the men's 66 kg but lost to Wander Mateo in the second round.

References

1986 births
Living people
Democratic Republic of the Congo male judoka
Olympic judoka of the Democratic Republic of the Congo
Judoka at the 2016 Summer Olympics